The tomato is a brightly colored (usually red) berry.

Tomato may also refer to:

Entertainment 
"Tomato" (song), a 1949 calypso often known as "Don't Touch Me Tomato"
Tomato (album), by the South Korean girl group Chakra
Tomato (musician) (b. 1969), a singer/drummer/songwriter for the alternative rock band Sound of Urchin
Tomato the Cutesy Gumshoe, a one-shot manga by Akira Toriyama
 "Tomatoes", an episode of the television series New Girl
the title character in the 1984 video game Princess Tomato in the Salad Kingdom

Businesses 
Tomato Bank, a private overseas Chinese bank in the US
Tomato (design collective), a UK company doing multimedia and graphical design, founded in 1991
Tomato (mobile phone operator), a Croatian mobile virtual network operator

Other uses 
Tomato (firmware), free firmware for Broadcom-based wireless routers
Tomato, Arkansas, an unincorporated community
Clyde Mandelin, a translator also known as Tomato

See also
 Tormato, a 1978 album by English progressive rock band Yes
 Tomati
 Tomatis

fr:Tomate (homonymie)